Margarethe "Greta" Delport (born 29 April 1945) is a South African former tennis player.

Born in Port Elizabeth, Delport was most active in the 1960s and her career included a singles third round appearance at the 1967 Wimbledon Championships. She participated in South Africa's winning 1972 Federation Cup campaign.

See also
List of South Africa Fed Cup team representatives

References

External links
 
 

1945 births
Living people
South African female tennis players
Sportspeople from Port Elizabeth